RING-box protein 1 is a protein that in humans is encoded by the RBX1 gene.

Function 

This gene encodes an evolutionarily conserved protein that interacts with cullins. The protein plays a unique role in the ubiquitination reaction by heterodimerizing with cullin-1 to catalyze ubiquitin polymerization. It also may be involved in the regulation of protein turn-over.

Interactions 

RBX1 has been shown to interact with:

 CAND1, 
 CUL1, 
 CUL2, 
 CUL4A, 
 CUL5 
 CUL7,
 DCUN1D1,  and
 P70-S6 Kinase 1.

References

Further reading